Eulagisca corrientis is a scale worm known from the subantarctic Heard Island and Kerguelen Island and the Ross Sea in Antarctica, at depths of about 200–1000m.

Description
Eulagisa corrientis has 38 segments and 15 pairs of elytra. The lateral antennae are inserted terminally on anterior margin of the prostomium. The elytra bear a marginal fringe of papillae and the notochaetae are distinctly thicker than the neurochaetae, with bidentate neurochaetae also present.

References

Phyllodocida